Floh or variation, may refer to:

 DFW Floh, a German WWI biplane fighter
 Fokker V.1, a German WWI fighter nicknamed "Floh"
 Floh (book), a 2001 photobook by Tacita Dean
 "Floh" (song), a 2013 song by Madlib from Rock Konducta
 , Floh-Seligenthal, Schmalkalden-Meiningen, Thuringia, Germany

See also

 Meister Floh (novel), 1822 fantasy novel by ETA Hoffmann
 Flohlied, an 1844 composition by Franz Liszt; see List of compositions by Franz Liszt

 Flow (disambiguation)
 Flou (disambiguation)
 Floe (disambiguation)
 Flo (disambiguation)
 Flea (disambiguation)